Flight 4 or Flight 004 may refer to:

Aeroflot Flight 4, crashed on 15 August 1958
Avianca Flight 4, crashed on 14 January 1966
Lauda Air Flight 004, crashed on 26 May 1991

0004